Charles Frederick Joy (13 September 1911 – 12 April 1989) FRAeS was a British aeronautical engineer and designer.

Career
He started at Armstrong Whitworth Aircraft in 1927, staying until 1940. From 1940 to 1941 he was at the Gloster Aircraft Company.

Handley Page

He joined Handley Page in 1944 as Deputy Chief Draughtsman, becoming assistant chief designer in 1947.

He became chief designer at Handley Page Aircraft in 1953, when Reginald Stafford was technical director. He also had been deputy managing director at Handley Page. When the Victor aircraft was being developed, he was the assistant chief designer.

Jetstream
As chief designer, he was responsible for the Handley Page Jetstream, which first flew on 18 August 1967 at Radlett in Hertfordshire. It was planned to produce around 10 Jetstreams a month.

The Jetstream is the UK's third-most successful airliner. It was cancelled in May 1997 when known as the British Aerospace Jetstream 41, due to it entering a sector for larger type of airliners, with commercially well-established competition. The last one was built in May 1998.

He left Handley Page in December 1969, when the company was taken over.

Awards
He received the RAeS Silver Medal in 1967.

Personal life
He married Winifred Downes in 1936 in Coventry. They had a son in 1939.  He died in the Wycombe District on 12 April 1989.

References

 The Handley Page Victor: The History & Development of a Classic Jet, Volume 1

1911 births
1989 deaths
English aerospace engineers
Fellows of the Royal Aeronautical Society
Handley Page
Royal Aeronautical Society Silver Medal winners